Glyphodes royalis is a moth in the family Crambidae. It was described by Hubert Marion in 1954. It is found in Guinea.

References

Moths described in 1954
Glyphodes